Circuito Monteblanco, built in 2005/06  is  located in the municipality of La Palma del Condado, a town in the province of Huelva, South of Spain, at the foot of the Autopista del Quinto Centenario ( A-49, E-1 ). It is accessed via the network of road links with nearby major cities such as Seville or Faro (Portugal).  Both cities have international airports. 

In 2019, Formula E's all-electric autonomous feeder racing series Roborace raced here.

Monteblanco circuit is used for professional motorsport and motor industry events and testing programs.

Located in Andalusia, the circuit accommodates events throughout the calendar year such as: 
 Product Presentations 
 Testing Programs 
 Corporate Events 
 Sales Network Training
 Track Days 
 Vehicle Development 
 Filming commercials 
 Incentives 
 Driving Courses 
 A wide range of complementary activities within and surrounding the circuit.

Facilities

Building
 A variety of function rooms from 110m2 and 340m2 of surface area
 Restaurant and café 
 24 modular pit-boxes equipped with monitors 
 4 hospitality rooms with direct access from the pit-box 
 Race control room with CCTV and image recording system. 
 27 cameras along the track circuit for monitoring 
 Timing system 
 Fuelling station and car wash area

Track
 FIA homologated T1 (F1 Testing) & FIA Grade 2 (Races up to GP2) 
 GP Circuit Length: 4,430 m 
 26 variants of circuit characteristics and different average speeds 
 12 possible combinations for simultaneous use of two completely independent tracks 
 3 independent pit-lanes 
 Internal circuit of 1,437 m equipped with sprinklers and epoxy surface for wet weather testing conditions 
 Maximum circuit length 4,730 m 
 The length of the main straight: 960 m 
 The width of the main straight: 15 m 
 The rest of the circuit width: 13 m 
 % Of corners: 19% 
 % Of straights: 81% 
 4.4% maximum gradient 
 36,000 m2 of asphalt run-off area and 50,000 m2 of gravel beds

A huge number of different layouts are available depending on the vehicle using the track. This in turn, means the track can be tailored to replicate all the different elements; fast, slow and medium corners as well as high speed sections. Polyvalent installations, offering multiple tracks, an urban circuit and maximum safety levels. Ideal location in the South of Spain, offering good weather conditions all year round 

Twenty six different combinations can be designed for various testing requirements. It's got one of the highest FIA gradings available which means that Circuito Monteblanco can host anything apart from Formula 1 racing. Racing does take place at the track as well as track days and testing make up a large proportion of the usage during the year. Facilities are a very high quality throughout the track with 24 garages and all of the facilities which are expected at a track of this nature

Paddock
33,000 m2 paddock divided into two zones for dynamic tests such as slalom, curve tracing, emergency braking, acceleration / traction, car dynamics (understeer / oversteer), wet skid control and stability control.  The sprinkler system design offers wet weather conditions simulation and our 70m x 4m area of epoxy surface can be used to test braking without adhesion.

Testing
The design of Monteblanco with 26 variants of track and 12 combinations for the use of two tracks simultaneously, together with the privileged climate with values of mean monthly temperature of 11.5 °C in January, 27.5 °C in July and average annual rainfall of 450l / m 2 (55 days of annual rainfall approximately), makes us an ideal location for the development of testing programs. 
Monteblanco, in addition to complying with the latest FIA specifications, with improvements in key points as the design of asphalt-gravel mixed loopholes, which increase the level of passive safety for motorcycles and cars.  Its control system equipped with 27 video cameras allows continuous monitoring of track vehicles.

Notes

Sports venues in Andalusia
Motorsport venues in Andalusia
2006 establishments in Spain